Zany Brainy was a United States retail store chain owned by FAO Schwarz that sold educational toys and multi-media products aimed at children ages 4–13. Its merchandise included games and puzzles; infant development toys; books, audiocassettes, CDs, videos; arts and crafts; building toys and trains; computer software; electronic learning aids and musical instruments; science toys; plush toys and dolls; and sports-themed toys. The stores offered daily events such as workshops, concerts, and author appearances.

David Schlessinger, who had earlier started the now-defunct Encore Books chain of bookstores, founded Zany Brainy in 1991. The company's CEO was Thomas Vellios. The company filed for Chapter 11 bankruptcy protection on May 15, 2001, having faced financial difficulties since acquiring rival company Noodle Kidoodle in 2000. Later in 2001, Zany Brainy's assets were sold to Right Start. At the time of the sale, Zany Brainy had 187 retail locations nationwide. Zany Brainy announced the shuttering of its remaining stores in December 2003.

David Schlessinger and Tom Vellios would later open a chain of discount stores named Five Below.

Zany Brainy was revived as an online store in 2020, with a select line of products.

References 

Retail companies established in 1991
Retail companies disestablished in 2003
Companies that filed for Chapter 11 bankruptcy in 2001
Toy retailers of the United States
Educational toy retailers
1991 establishments in Pennsylvania
2003 disestablishments in Pennsylvania
Friends Select School alumni
Defunct retail companies of the United States